Bradley Michael Snyder (born May 25, 1982) is an American former professional baseball outfielder. He was raised in Bellevue, Ohio, and attended Ball State University from 2001–2003. He played in Major League Baseball for the Chicago Cubs and Texas Rangers.

Playing career

College
In 168 games with Ball State, Snyder hit .378 with 36 home runs and 150 RBI.

Cleveland Indians
The Cleveland Indians selected him with the 18th overall pick in the first round of the 2003 Major League Baseball draft.

Chicago Cubs
He was claimed off waivers by the Chicago Cubs on September 22,  and sent to minor league camp on March 29, 2009. He was limited to 74 games in 2009 due to a sprained wrist. He hit .278 with 15 HR, 47 RBI and 40 runs with Triple-A Iowa.

Snyder was called up to the Chicago Cubs on September 7, 2010 and made his major league debut the same day following a season with the AAA Iowa Cubs where he hit .308 with 25 home runs and 106 RBIs. He recorded his first major league hit in his first start, a 2-run single off of Brett Sinkbeil. In 12 games with Chicago, he hit 5-27 with 1 double, 1 run and 5 RBI.

The Cubs purchased his contract on May 29, 2011. He was designated for assignment on June 11. In 9 games with Chicago, he hit 1-9 with a run. After the 2011 season, he elected for free agency. In 102 games with Iowa in 2011, he hit .290 with 11 HR, 57 RBI and 48 runs.

Houston Astros
On November 12, 2011, he signed a minor league contract with the Houston Astros. In 122 games with the Triple-A Oklahoma City RedHawks, he hit .304 with 20 HR, 66 RBI and 65 runs.

Arizona Diamondbacks
In November, 2012 he signed a minor league contract with the Arizona Diamondbacks.

Texas Rangers
On November 14, 2013 Snyder signed a minor league contract with the Texas Rangers. His contract was purchased from the Triple-A Round Rock Express on June 10, 2014 when Mitch Moreland was placed on the disabled list. He played in ten games, all as a first baseman, hitting .167. He was designated for assignment on June 24 and elected to become a free agent.

Somerset Patriots
On March 24, 2016, Snyder signed with the Somerset Patriots of the Atlantic League of Professional Baseball.

Vaqueros Laguna
On June 28, 2016, Snyder signed with the Vaqueros Laguna of the Mexican Baseball League. He was released on June 16, 2017.

References

External links

Career statistics and player information from Korea Baseball Organization

1982 births
Living people
Akron Aeros players
American expatriate baseball players in Mexico
American expatriate baseball players in South Korea
Arizona League Cubs players
Ball State Cardinals baseball players
Baseball players from Ohio
Buffalo Bisons (minor league) players
Chicago Cubs players
Iowa Cubs players
Kinston Indians players
Lake County Captains players
LG Twins players
Mahoning Valley Scrappers players
Major League Baseball first basemen
Major League Baseball left fielders
Major League Baseball right fielders
Mexican League baseball left fielders
KBO League outfielders
Kiwoom Heroes players
Oklahoma City RedHawks players
People from Bellevue, Ohio
Reno Aces players
Round Rock Express players
Somerset Patriots players
Sportspeople from Sandusky, Ohio
Texas Rangers players
Vaqueros Laguna players
Vaqueros Unión Laguna players